Mike Klapak (March 8, 1913 – March 13, 1997) was an American NASCAR race car driver from Warren, Ohio.

Grand National Division
He ran in multiple years in the Grand National Division and competed multiple times at the Daytona Beach Road Course.

Sportsman Division
Klapak was a three-time champion of the Sportsman division, from which the Xfinity Series is a direct descendant.

ARCA Racing
Klapak was a successful racer in the ARCA Racing Series.

Awards
Klapak was the 2009 pioneer selection for the Northeast Dirt Modified Hall of Fame.

References

External links

1913 births
1997 deaths
American racing drivers
NASCAR drivers
USAC Stock Car drivers